KFME may refer to:

 KFME (TV), a television station (channel 13) licensed to Fargo, North Dakota, United States
 the ICAO code for Tipton Airport